Palaquium cryptocariifolium is a tree in the family Sapotaceae. The specific epithet cryptocariifolium refers to the resemblance of the leaves to those of the tree genus Cryptocarya.

Description
The bark is brownish grey.

Distribution and habitat
Palaquium cryptocariifolium is native to Borneo, Peninsular Malaysia and Sumatra. Its habitat is mixed dipterocarp and kerangas forests at elevations above .

Conservation
Palaquium cryptocariifolium has been assessed as near threatened on the IUCN Red List. The species is threatened by logging and land conversion for palm oil plantations.

References

cryptocariifolium
Flora of Borneo
Flora of Peninsular Malaysia
Flora of Sumatra
Plants described in 1960